Hugo Álvarez Quintas (born 21 June 1985) is a Spanish footballer who plays as a central defender.

Club career
Born in Vigo, Galicia, Álvarez made his senior debuts with Las Rozas CF, after playing youth football with RC Celta de Vigo and Real Madrid. He first arrived in Segunda División B in summer 2006 by signing for Rayo Vallecano, and remained in that level for that and the following six seasons, representing in quick succession CD Leganés, AD Alcorcón, Zamora CF, UD Almería B, Real Unión and FC Cartagena.

On 11 July 2013, Álvarez joined Real Jaén, freshly promoted to division two. On 25 August he made his debut as a professional, playing the full 90 minutes in a 2–4 away defeat against CD Numancia in the Segunda División championship; he scored his first goal on 8 September in a 3–1 home win against Girona FC, and appeared regularly for the Andalusians which were relegated at the end of the campaign.

On 22 July 2014, Álvarez moved to fellow league club Real Murcia. However, after its administrative relegation, he terminated his contract and signed with CD Tenerife also in the second tier.

After appearing regularly for the Canarians, Álvarez joined Elche CF in the same division on 10 August 2015. On 1 July of the following year, he moved to fellow league side UCAM Murcia CF.

On 6 July 2017, after suffering relegation, Álvarez returned to Alcorcón after agreeing to a two-year deal.

References

External links
 
 
 

1985 births
Living people
Spanish footballers
Footballers from Vigo
Association football defenders
Las Rozas CF players
Rayo Vallecano B players
Rayo Vallecano players
CD Leganés players
AD Alcorcón footballers
Zamora CF footballers
UD Almería B players
Real Unión footballers
FC Cartagena footballers
Real Jaén footballers
Real Murcia players
CD Tenerife players
Elche CF players
UCAM Murcia CF players
Segunda División players
Segunda División B players
Tercera División players